Repalle is a constituency in Bapatla district of Andhra Pradesh, representing the state legislative assembly in India. It is one of the seven assembly segments of Bapatla (SC) (Lok Sabha constituency), along with Vemuru, Bapatla, Parchur, Addanki, Chirala and Santhanuthalapadu. Anagani Satya Prasad is the present MLA of the constituency, who won the 2019 Andhra Pradesh Legislative Assembly election from TDP Party. As of 25 March 2019, there are a total of 194,748 electors in the constituency.

Mandals

Members of Legislative Assembly 

Anagani Satya Prasad is the present MLA of the constituency, representing the Telugu Desam Party. He has won the 2014 Andhra Pradesh Assembly Elections by defeating Mopidevi Venkata Ramana Rao of YSR Congress Party.

Election results

Assembly elections 2019

Assembly elections 2014

Assembly elections 2009

Assembly elections 2004

Assembly elections 1999

Assembly elections 1994

Assembly elections 1989

Assembly elections 1985

Assembly elections 1983

Assembly elections 1978

Assembly elections 1972

Assembly elections 1967

Assembly elections 1962

Assembly elections 1955

Assembly elections 1952

References

Further reading 
 

Assembly constituencies of Andhra Pradesh